Dokolo is a town in the Northern Region of Uganda. It is the main municipal, administrative, and commercial centre of Dokolo District.

Location
Dokolo lies on the main highway, A-104, between Lira and Soroti. The coordinates of the town are 1°55'07.0"N, 33°10'12.0"E (Latitude:1.9186; Longitude:33.1700).

Population
In 2002, the national population census estimated the town's population at 13,200. In 2010, the Uganda Bureau of Statistics (UBOS) estimated the population at 17,500. In 2011, UBOS estimated the mid-year population at 18,100. In 2014, the national population census put the population at 19,810

In 2015 the population of the town was projected at 20,500. In 2020, the mid-year population of Dokolo Town Council was projected at 23,700. It was calculated that the town's population grew at an average annual rate of 2.9 percent, between 2015 and 2020.

Points of interest
The following additional points of interest lie within the town limits or close to the edges of town: (1) the offices of Dokolo Town Council (2) Dokolo central market (3) Dokolo Health Centre IV (4) a branch of DFCU Bank (5) Lango Broadcasting Survive (6) Dokolo FM Radio Station and (7) the Soroti–Dokolo–Lira Road passes through town in a general southeast to northwest direction.

Notable people
Okello Oculi, novelist and poet

See also
Lango sub-region
Langi people
List of cities and towns in Uganda

References

External links
 Dokolo Averagely Clean, But...

Populated places in Northern Region, Uganda
Cities in the Great Rift Valley
Dokolo District
Lango sub-region